The Indian Antarctic Programme is a multi-disciplinary, multi-institutional programme under the control of the National Centre for Polar and Ocean Research, Ministry of Earth Sciences, Government of India. It was initiated in 1981 with the first Indian expedition to Antarctica. The programme gained global acceptance with India's signing of the Antarctic Treaty and subsequent construction of the Dakshin Gangotri Antarctic research base in 1983, superseded by the Maitri base from 1989. The newest base commissioned in 2012 is Bharati, constructed out of 134 shipping containers.  Under the programme, atmospheric, biological, earth, chemical, and medical sciences are studied by India, which has carried out 40 scientific expeditions to the Antarctic.

History

The origin of the  Indian missions to the Antarctic are traced to the joint Indian Space Research Organisation – Hydrometeorological Centre of Russia agreements, which led to Indians, such as Dr. Paramjit Singh Sehra, joining the 17th Soviet Antarctic expedition of 1971–1973.

India officially acceded to the Antarctic Treaty System on 1 August 1983. On 12 September 1983, the country became the fifteenth Consultative Member of the Antarctic Treaty.

Organization

The National Centre for Polar and Ocean Research—a research and development body functioning under the Ministry of Earth Sciences, Government of India—controls the Indian Antarctic Programme. The NCPOR and the Department of Ocean Development select the members for India's Antarctic expeditions. After medical tests and subsequent acclimatisation training at the Himalayas, these selected members are also trained in survival, environment ethics, firefighting and operating in a group.

Logistical support to the various activities of the Indian Antarctic Programme is provided by the relevant branches of the Indian armed forces. The launching point of Indian expeditions has varied from Goa in India to Cape Town in South Africa on 19th expedition during the time of NCAOR Founding Director Dr. P C Pandey in December 1999. Over 70 institutes in India contributed to its Antarctic Programme as of 2007.

Global cooperation

The Indian Antarctic Programme is bound by the rules of the Antarctic Treaty System, which India signed in 1983. Pandey (2007) outlines the various international activities that India has undertaken as a part of its Antarctic Programme:

India also collaborates with the international community as a member of the Intergovernmental Oceanographic Commission, Regional Committee of Intergovernmental Oceanographic Commission in Coastal Indian Ocean (IOCINDIO), International Seabed Authority (ISBA), and the State Parties of the United Nations Convention on the Law of the Seas (UNCLOS).

Research

Antarctica holds scientific interest for global research projects due to a number of reasons: 'Origin of continents, climate change, meteorology and pollution' are among the reasons cited by S.D. Gad (2008). Mrinalini G. Walawalkar (2005) holds that: 'ice–ocean interaction and the global processes; paleoenvironment and paleoclimatic studies; geological evolution of earth and Gondwanaland reconstruction; Antarctic ecosystems, biodiversity and environment physiology; solar terrestrial processes and their coupling; medical physiology, adaptation techniques and human psychology; environment impact assessment and monitoring; enabling low temperature technology development; and studies on earthquakes' are among the areas of study under the Indian Antarctic Programme.

Close to 1,300 Indians had been to the continent as of 2001 as a part of the country's Antarctic Programme. Indian expeditions to the Antarctic also study the fauna and the molecular biodiversity of the region. A total of 120 new microbes had been discovered as a result of international scientific effort in the Antarctic by 2005. 30 of these microbes had been discovered by Indian scientists. India has also published over 300 research publications based on Antarctic studies as of 2007.

The 'ice cores' retrieved by drilling holes in Antarctic's vast ice-sheets yield information 'on the palaeoclimate and eco-history of the earth as records of wind-blown dust, volcanic ash or radioactivity are preserved in the ice as it gets accumulated over time'. The NCAOR developed a polar research & development laboratory with a 'low-temperature laboratory complex at −20 °C for preservation and analysis of ice core and snow samples' according to S.D. Gad (2008). The 'ice core' samples are held, processed, and analysed in containment units designed by such technology. Storage cases made of poly propylene also ensure that the samples do not alter characteristics and are preserved for analysis in the form that they were recovered.

Research stations
In 1981 the Indian flag unfurled for the first time in Antarctica, marking the start of Southern Ocean expeditions under the environmental protocol of the Antarctic Treaty (1959).

Dakshin Gangotri 

The first permanent settlement was built in 1983 and named Dakshin Gangotri. In 1989 it was excavated and is being used again as supply base and transit camp. Dakshin Gangotri was decommissioned in the year 1990 after half of it got buried under the ice. It is nothing more than a historical site now. In its times, it used to double up as a place for multiple support systems, including the presence of an ice-melting plant, laboratories, storage, accommodation, recreation facilities, a clinic and also a bank counter.

Maitri 

The second permanent settlement, Maitri, was put up in 1989 on the Schirmacher Oasis and has been conducting experiments in geology, geography and medicine. India built this station close to a freshwater lake around Maitri known as Lake Priyadarshini. Maitri accomplished the mission of geomorphologic mapping of Schirmacher Oasis.

Bharati 

Located beside Larsmann Hill at 69°S, 76°E, Bharati is established in 2015. This newest research station for oceanographic research will collect evidence of continental break-up to reveal the 120-million-year-old ancient history of the Indian subcontinent. In news sources this station was variously spelled "Bharathi", "Bharti" and "Bharati".

India Post Office in Antarctica 
It was established in the year 1984 during the third Indian expedition to Antarctica. It was located at Dakshin Gangotri. As many as 10,000 letters were posted and cancelled in this post office in total in the first year of its establishment. Although the post office is no more there, it is a favourite stopover for Indian tourists who visit the place in cruise ships.

The current Indian post office in Antarctica is situated at Maitri, where the country's current research station is also situated.

Indian Antarctic expeditions

Notes

References
 Gad, S. D. (2008), "India in the Antarctic", Current Science, 95 (2): 151, Bangalore: Indian Academy of Sciences.
 Pandey, P.C. (2007) in "India: Antarctic Program", Encyclopedia of the Antarctic edited by Beau Riffenburgh, pp. 529–530, Abingdon and New York: Taylor & Francis, .
 Pursuit and Promotion of Science – The Indian Experience (2001), New Delhi: Indian National Science Academy.
 Walawalkar, M. G. (2005), "Antarctica and Arctic: India's contribution", Current Science, 685, Bangalore: Indian Academy of Science.

External links
 National Centre for Antarctic & Ocean Research (NCAOR), Ministry of Earth Sciences, Government of India.

 
Antarctic programme
India